This is a list of CBI bids by school. 144 different college teams have participated in the CBI to date. The list is updated through the 2022 College Basketball Invitational.

School names reflect those now in use by their athletic programs, which may not reflect names in use when a team made a tournament appearance.

See also
NCAA Men's Division I Tournament bids by school
NCAA Men's Division I Tournament bids by school and conference
NCAA Women's Division I Tournament bids by school
NIT bids by school and conference
NCIT bids by school
CIT bids by school

References

College men's basketball records and statistics in the United States